N'abania is the debut studio album by Nigerian singer Flavour N'abania, released in 2005. The album comprises 12 tracks and features guest appearances from Mr Raw, Skit, Prophecy and D Mustard.

Singles
"N'abania" was released as one of the album's singles, and features guest vocals by Mr Raw. The song's lyrics addresses the expectations of nightlife events. Nigerian musician J. Martins made a cameo appearance in the music video. "Nwa Baby" was also released as one of the album's singles. Its music video was directed by Bobby Hai.

Track listing

Personnel

Chinedu Okoli – primary artist
Mr Raw – featured artist 
Skit – featured artist
Prophecy – featured artist 
D Mustard – featured artist
Bobby Hai – music video director

Release history

References

2005 albums
Flavour N'abania albums
Igbo-language albums